David Smart may refer to:
 Dave Smart (born 1966), Canadian basketball coach
David Smart (circus proprietor) (1929-2007), co-owner of the British Billy Smart's Circus
David A. Smart (1892–1952), American magazine founder and editor, namesake of David and Alfred Smart Museum of Art in Chicago